The Hispaniola monkey (Antillothrix bernensis) is an extinct primate that was endemic on the island of Hispaniola, in the present-day Dominican Republic. The species is thought to have gone extinct around the 16th century. The exact timing and cause of the extinction are unclear, but it is likely related to the settlement of Hispaniola by Europeans after 1492.

Description 
Horovitz and MacPhee developed the hypothesis, first proposed by MacPhee et al., that all the Antillean monkeys (the others being the two Cuban monkey species of genus Paralouatta, and the Jamaican monkey, Xenothrix mcgregori) belonged to a monophyletic group linked most closely with the modern genus Callicebus. They later assigned the Antillean monkeys to the tribe Xenotrichini – the sister group of the tribe Callicebini with extensive anatomical comparisons and by extending their parsimony analysis using PAUP*. They maintained that the monophyly of the Antillean monkeys was still supported in the most parsimonious trees, but in slightly less parsimonious trees, Aotus appeared to be linked with Xenothrix.

Skull discovery 
In July 2009, Walter Pickel found a A. bernensis skull while diving in underwater caves. The skull was found in the La Jeringa Cave of Cotubanamá National Park. The skull, long bones and ribs were recovered by Walter Pickel and Curt Bowen in October 2009 under the supervision of the Dominican Republic and Alfred L. Rosenberger from Brooklyn College. The discovery supported the MacPhee et al. hypothesis of a monophyletic origin of the Antilles monkeys. This 2009 discovery of the skull suggested that these primates were diurnal, due to their relatively smaller ocular orbits.

See also 

 Fossil primates of Central and South America and the Caribbean

References 

†Hispaniola monkey
Prehistoric monkeys
Mammal extinctions since 1500
Prehistoric mammals of North America
Endemic fauna of Hispaniola
Mammals of Hispaniola
Extinct animals of the Dominican Republic
Fossils of the Dominican Republic
Mammals of the Dominican Republic
Mammals described in 1977